Bethlehem Township is a township in Henry County, in the U.S. state of Missouri.

Bethlehem Township was established in 1873, taking its name from a Baptist church of the same name within its borders.

References

Townships in Missouri
Townships in Henry County, Missouri